Oscar Luis Vera (born 11 May 1976 in Santa Fe) is a retired Argentine football defender. He played for Unión de Santa Fe, Widzew Łódź, C.D. Regional Atacama, FK Dinamo Tirana, Club Atlético Sarmiento, Gimnasia y Esgrima de Concepción del Uruguay, and Club Bamin Real Potosí.

External links
 Argentine Primera statistics  
 

1976 births
Living people
Association football defenders
Argentine footballers
Unión de Santa Fe footballers
Widzew Łódź players
Puerto Montt footballers
Argentine expatriate footballers
Expatriate footballers in Chile
Expatriate footballers in Albania
Expatriate footballers in Bolivia
Expatriate footballers in Poland
Club Real Potosí players
Club Atlético Sarmiento footballers
Argentine expatriate sportspeople in Chile
Argentine expatriate sportspeople in Bolivia
Argentine expatriate sportspeople in Poland
Footballers from Santa Fe, Argentina